Erna is a feminine given name. Bearers of the name include:

 Erna von Abendroth (1887–1959), pioneering German nurse and trainer/teacher
 Erna Auerbach (1897–1975), German-born British artist and art historian
 Erna Barschak (1888–1958), German teacher and psychologist
 Erna Baumbauer (1919–2010), German casting agent
 Erna Beilhardt, Nazi concentration camp guard and nurse
 Erna Berger (1900–1990), German soprano
 Erna Björk Sigurðardóttir (born 1982), Icelandic footballer
 Erna Bogen-Bogáti (1906–2002), Hungarian fencer
 Erna Braun, Canadian politician
 Erna Brinkman (born 1972), Dutch volleyball player
 Erna Brodber (born 1940), Jamaican writer, sociologist and activist
 Erna Bürger (1909–1958), German gymnast
 Erna Fentsch (1909–1997), German actress and screenwriter
 Erna Fergusson (1888–1964), American writer and historian
 Erna Flegel (1911–2006), German nurse
 Erna Friðriksdóttir (born 1987), Icelandic alpine skier
 Erna Frins (born 1960), Uruguayan physicist
 Erna Furman (1926–2002), Austrian-American child psychologist
 Erna Gunther (1896–1982), American anthropologist
 Erna Hanfstaengl (1885–1981), German acquaintance of Adolf Hitler
 Erna P. Harris (1906-1995), American journalist and businesswoman
 Erna Hennicot-Schoepges (born 1941), Luxembourgish politician
 Erna Kelm (1912–1962), German woman killed trying to cross the Berlin Wall
 Erna Lazarus (1903–2006), American screenwriter
 Erna Lendvai-Dircksen (1883–1962), German photographer
 Erna Low (1909–2002), Austrian businesswoman
 Erna Mohr (1894–1968), German zoologist
 Erna Morena (1885–1962), German actress
 Erna Osland (born 1951), Norwegian teacher and author
 Erna Paris, Canadian writer
 Erna Petermann (1912–?), Nazi concentration camp overseer
 Erna Petri (1920–2000), Nazi war criminal
 Erna Rosenstein (1913–2004), Polish surrealist painter
 Erna Sack (1898–1972), German soprano
 Erna Scheffler (1893–1983), German jurist
 Erna Schillig (1900–1993), Swiss painter
 Erna Schilling (1884–1945), German nightclub dancer and artist's model
 Erna Schneider Hoover (born 1926), American mathematician
 Erna Schürer, Italian actress
 Erna Sellmer (1905–1983), German actress
 Erna Siikavirta (born 1977), Finnish keyboard player
 Erna Solberg (born 1961), Norwegian politician
 Erna Sondheim (1904–2008), German fencer
 Erna Spoorenberg (1925–2004), Dutch soprano
 Erna Steinberg (1911–2001), German Olympic sprinter
 Erna Steuri (1917–2001), Swiss alpine skier
 Erna Tauro (1916–1993), Finnish-Swedish pianist and composer
 Erna Viitol (1920–2001), Estonian sculptor
 Erna Villmer (1889–1965), Estonian actress
 Erna Visk (1910–1983), Estonian and Soviet politician
 Erna Wallisch (1922–2008), alleged Nazi concentration camp guard
 Erna Weill (1904–1996), American German-Jewish sculptor
 Erna Woll (1917–2005), German composer
 Erna Beth Yackel (1939–2022), American mathematics educator

Estonian feminine given names
German feminine given names